Rah Kola (also Romanized as Rāh Kolā) is a village in Karipey Rural District, Lalehabad District, Babol County, Mazandaran Province, Iran. At the 2006 census, its population was 446, in 118 families.

References 

Populated places in Babol County